= Muin Xalfa Bobo Mausoleum =

19th century monument in Tashkent, Uzbekistan

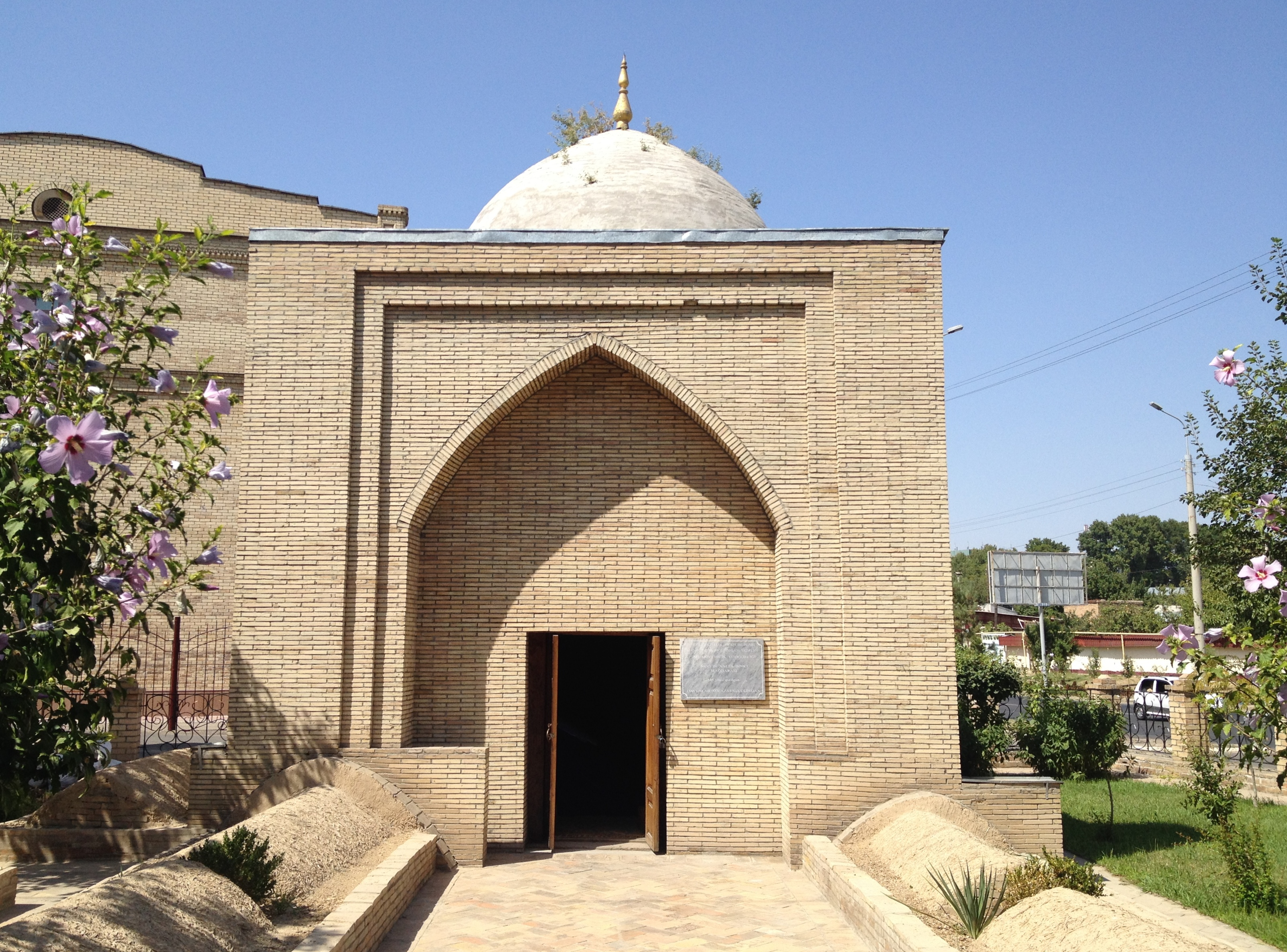
- Muin Xalfa Bobo Mausoleum in Tashkent
- Interactive map of the Muin Xalfa Bobo Mausoleum area

General information
- Architectural style: Islamic
- Location: Karasarayskaya Street, Tashkent, Uzbekistan
- Coordinates: 41.3148°N 69.2692°E
- Year built: 1845 or 1883-1884
- Renovated: 2007

Technical details
- Material: Burnt flat-tile brick and ganch
- Size: 5.48 × 6.16 meters
- Floor count: 1

Design and construction
- Architect: Muin Xalfa Bobo

The Muin Xalfa Bobo Mausoleum (Uzbek: Muin Xalfa Bobo maqbarasi) is a 19th-century architectural monument, a mausoleum in Tashkent, Uzbekistan.

== Location ==
The building is located at Karasarayskaya Street, house 89. The tomb was the main structure of a cult complex, which was later lost.

== History ==
The circumstances of the construction of the mausoleum were clarified from the words of Athan Kadyrov - a descendant of the buried, born in 1872. Muin-buva came from a peasant from Samarkand, studied in Karshi. He became a master-builder, a guild elder (khalfa) and built a tomb for himself, inviting Samarkand craftsmen to work. According to the words of the questioned old-timers, the construction was completed in 1845 (according to Kadyrov's statements, the building was 125 years old at the time of the inquiry).In the encyclopedia “Tashkent” (2008) it is reported that Muin Khalfa-bobo was an ishan, the date of construction is indicated as 1883, in an earlier edition of the encyclopedia (1983) 1884 was given.

In 2007, the building was renovated. During the renovation, the wall of the iwan for commemorations was decorated by a brigade of ganchkora, a folk master of Uzbekistan Asrol Mukhtarov.

== Architecture ==
Muin Khalfa-bobo belongs to the type of single-chamber portal-dome mausoleums. In plan, the structure is rectangular (5.48 × 6.16 meters), includes a single square room (3.05 × 3.05 meters), to which an iwan is attached in front. Above the chamber rises a sphericonical dome, set on a short cylindrical drum, dominating the external appearance of the building. The drum rests on false-spherical sails, formed by horizontal rows of bricks. The lower cubic volume serves as a pedestal for the dome. In the front part of the mausoleum, the continuation of the walls, rising, forms a portal. The configuration of the portal resembles a peshtak, due to the shallow lancet niche and the framing frames in the shape of the letter “P”. The size of the portal arch is 3.43 meters.

In the chamber there are two large tombstones-sagana, oriented in the direction from the facade to the back wall. The main burial belongs to Muin-buva himself, the second one to his son Umar-khan. There are four small flat niches in the walls.

The monument is not plastered and almost not decorated. The decor is represented only by a ring of molded ornaments (sharafa), separating the skufya of the dome, and templates of ganch on the archivolts of the arches, as well as ganch seams between the bricks of the facade. In the west wall there is a single window, through which the chamber is illuminated.

The tomb is built of polished burnt flat-tile brick (24-25 × 25 × 3.5 centimeters) on a clay mortar. The masonry of the arches and dome is on pure ganch. (10 rows together with 10 seams have a height of 59–61 cm).

On the iwan for commemorations, Asrol Mukhtarov together with his students laid out a ganch panel (palyak) “Khast-Imam”.

== Analysis of the architectural composition ==
It is believed that the building copies the outlines of an earlier Tashkent mausoleum - Chupan-ata, - moreover, it is built of the same brick and has a similar location of the window. However, the imitation took place with simplification: Muin Khalfa-bobo lacks the towers of the portal, figurative layouts, there are differences in the shape and masonry of the sails, the dome looks heavy. Considering the construction of the mausoleum in the middle of the 19th century, the compositional similarity of the portal with the peshtak should be considered a rudiment of an obsolete architectural form.

== Gallery ==
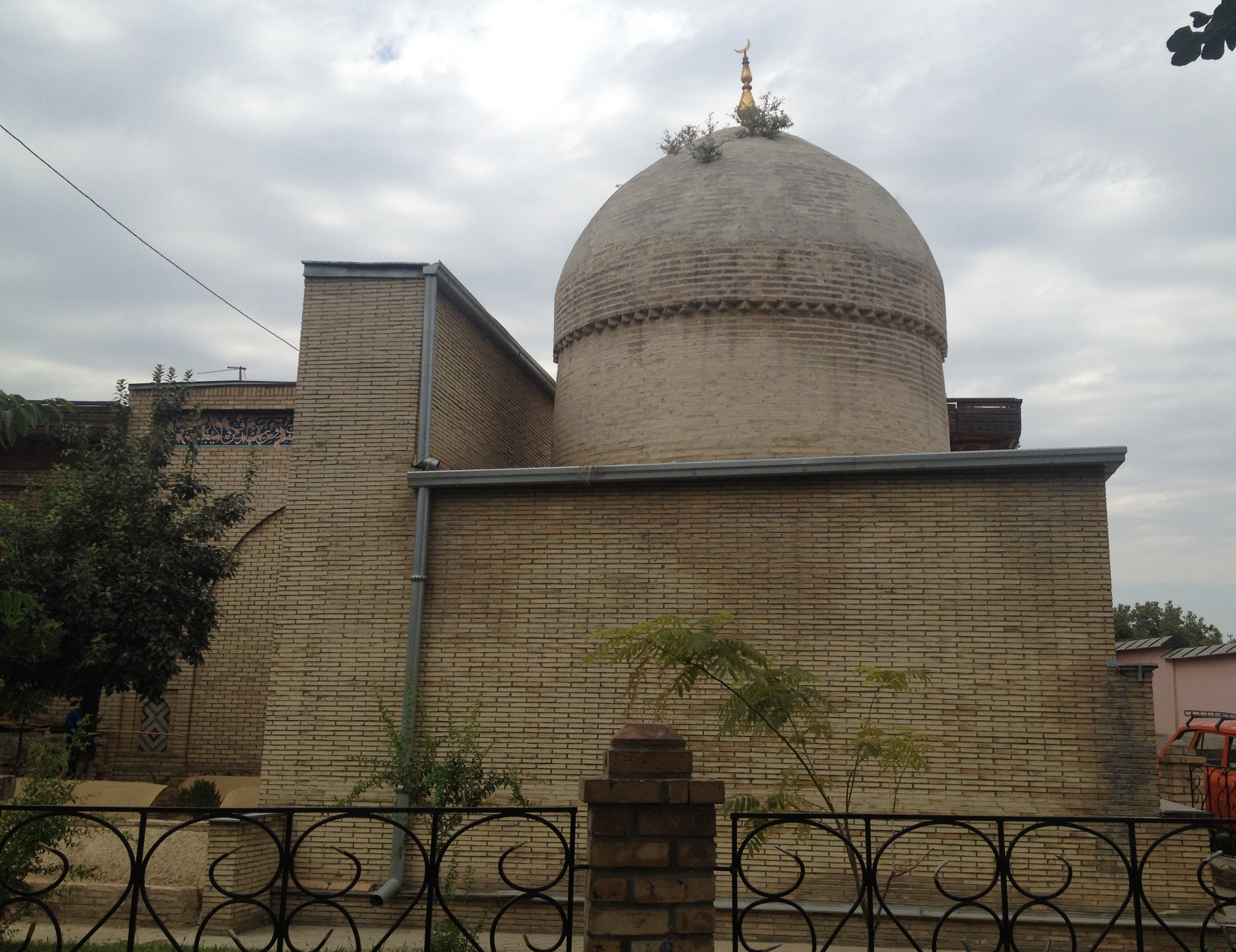
Muin Khalfa bobo mausoleum (2016)

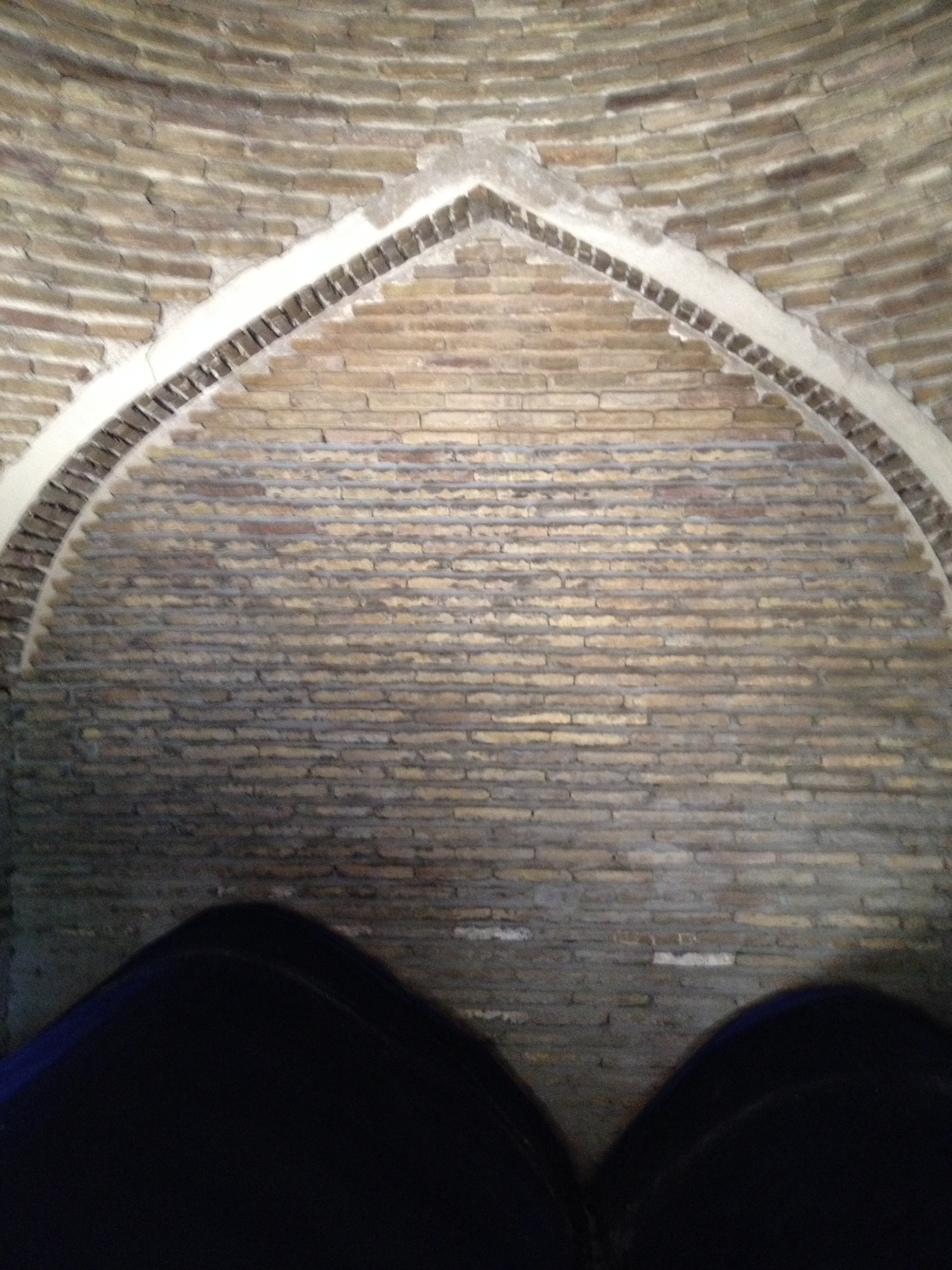
Interior of Muin Khalfa bobo mausoleum (2016)
